Brachylaimoidea is a superfamily of digenetic trematodes in the order Diplostomida.

Families
The following families are recognised:
Brachylaimidae Joyeux & Foley, 1930
Leucochloridiidae Poche, 1907
Hasstilesiidae Hall, 1916
Leucochloridiomorphidae Yamaguti, 1958
Moreauiidae Johnstone, 1915
Ovariopteridae Leonov, Spasski & Kulikov, 1963
Panopistidae Yamaguti, 1958
Thapariellidae Srivastava, 1953

References 

Diplostomida